Wandilo is a north-western suburb of Mount Gambier in the Australian state of South Australia.   It was named after the railway station on the Mount Gambier railway line, and is recorded to mean "a swamp where native companions resort".

Mount Gambier Airport is located in this suburb.

The 2016 Australian census which was conducted in August 2016 reports that Wandilo had a population of 176 people.

Wandilo is located within the federal division of Barker, the state electoral district of Mount Gambier and the local government area of the District Council of Grant. It is also part of Mount Gambier’s urban sprawl.

See also
 Mount Gambier Airport
 Wandilo bushfire

References
Citations

Towns in South Australia
Limestone Coast